Ramesh Chandra Vyas was an Indian politician.  He was elected to the Lok Sabha, the lower house of the Parliament of India from Bhilwara, Rajasthan as a member of the Indian National Congress.

References

External links
  Official biographical sketch in Parliament of India website

1918 births
India MPs 1957–1962
India MPs 1967–1970
Lok Sabha members from Rajasthan
Indian National Congress politicians
Year of death missing